Ligusticum porteri, also known as oshá (pronounced o-SHAW), wild parsnip, Porter’s Lovage or wild celery, is a perennial herb found in parts of the Rocky Mountains and northern New Mexico, especially in the southwestern United States.

Distribution
Oshá is strictly a mountain plant, and it is most commonly found in deep, moist soils rich in organic material.  The plant requires partial shade.   Oshá is widely distributed in the Rocky Mountains and the high mountains of northwestern New Mexico.  It is most common in the upper limits of the subalpine zone, so in the southern part of its range, it grows at elevations from 7,000 feet to 10,000 feet (2100 m to 3000 m), while in Utah and Wyoming, it grows as low as 5,000 feet (1500 m).

Oshá is dependent on mycorrhizal fungi, and attempts to artificially cultivate the plant outside of its habitat have not been successful.  Cultivation in areas where oshá naturally grows have been more successful.

Identification

Oshá has the typical appearance of members of the carrot family (apiaceae), with parsley-like leaves and double umbels of white flowers.  The bases of the leaves where they attach to the root crowns have a reddish tint which is unique, and the roots are fibrous, with a dark, chocolate-brown, wrinkled outer skin.  When this skin is removed, the inner root tissue is fibrous and yellowish-white with an overpowering, pleasant "spicy celery" fragrance that resembles lovage (Levisticum officinale).

Oshá roots have a collar of dead leaf material surrounding the root crowns which is hairlike in appearance.  The roots dry very quickly and are very astringent when fresh, and can cause blistering of the mouth and mucous membranes in humans if ingested fresh.  The dried roots do not have this astringent effect.   Roots of older plants are far stronger and more bitter than those of younger plants. 

Oshá plants form large clumps over time, and can grow to be very large.  In areas of New Mexico, Colorado, and Utah, oshá can reach heights of 6 to 7 feet and produce circular colonies with dozens of root crowns growing from a central root mass.  Oshá is best harvested in the afternoon as the plants are relished by bears, which are known to visit the plants during the morning.

Similar species
Oshá grows in the same habitat in areas of the Mountain West of North America with poison hemlock and water hemlock, highly poisonous members of the same family.  Oshá particularly resembles poison hemlock, but is easily distinguished from it by its "spicy celery" odor, hair-like material on root crowns, and dark chocolate-brown, wrinkled root skin.  Hemlock roots are white and fleshy and thin-skinned; they are typically heavily branched rather than carrot-like, but this is not always the case. Poison hemlock roots have little or no odor; the plants themselves smell "musty" or "mousy", or rank.  Oshá leaves have an intense fragrance when bruised and are typically larger than those of poison hemlock.  Most poison hemlock plants have purple blotches or shading on the lower stem if they are fairly mature, but again, this is not always the case. Unlike its poisonous cousins, oshá does not tolerate overly moist soils (because it depends on mycorrhizal fungi) and is never found growing in standing water.  Nevertheless, oshá and poison hemlock can be found only a few feet from each other.

If the plant is growing near water in consistently moist soil, is tall (0.75–2m), has purple splotches on the main stem, and is heavily branched with small umbels of white flowers, it is probably poison hemlock and should be avoided. In any case, due to the high toxicity of poison hemlock, if a supposed oshá plant cannot be positively identified, it must be discarded.

Coniine, the main poison in hemlock species, can be absorbed through the skin.  People who have come into contact with these plants, including crushing the leaves to perform a "smell test," should wash their hands immediately and avoid touching their eyes or mouth.

Cow parsnip (Heracleum lanatum, Heracleum maximum, Indian celery, or pushki, sometimes considered a subspecies of Heracleum sphondylium, hogweed or eltrot) is also confused with oshá and other plants with similar flower groupings.  However, cow parsnip has large, broad leaves and an unpleasant odor.

Cultural associations
In some Native American cultures, oshá is  called "bear root" or "bear medicine". According to the ethnobotanist Shawn Sigstedt, who lived and studied with the Diné, a story is told of the brown bear's affinity for the oshá roots. The bear would eat the roots and rub some of them over its fur. The Diné credit the bear with leading them to the medicine.

Etymology
The species name porteri honors the botanist and Christian clergyman Thomas Conrad Porter (1822–1901).

Oshá has been said to mean "bear" in a Native American language.  The original language is unknown, but note that the Spanish word for bear is Oso.

Common names
Its common names include oshá root, Porter's lovage, Porter's licorice-root, wild lovage, Porter's wild lovage, loveroot, Porter's ligusticum, bear medicine, bear root, Colorado cough root, Indian root, Indian parsley, wild parsley, mountain ginseng, mountain carrot, nipo, chuchupate, chuchupati, chuchupaste, chuchupatle, guariaca, hierba del cochino or yerba de cochino, raíz del cochino, and washí (tarahumara).  In the Jicarilla language, oshá is called ha’ich’idéé.

The White Mountain Apache call it ha 'il chii' gah. The Akimel O'Odham call it jujubáádi. The Rarámuri call it wasía.

Uses
This plant has many uses in Native American medicine. The Zuni use an infusion of the root for body aches. The root is also chewed during curing ceremonies for various illnesses, and the crushed root and water used as wash and taken for sore throat. The Rarámuri also use the root as herbal medicine.

References

External links
USDA page
 Medicinal Plant Fact Sheet: Ligusticum porteri / Osha

Plants used in traditional Native American medicine
porteri
Flora of the Western United States
Flora of Northwestern Mexico
Flora without expected TNC conservation status